Sami Ullah Khan is a Pakistani politician who had been a member of Provincial Assembly of the Punjab from August 2018 till January 2023.

Early life and education
He was born on 17 October 1960 in Lahore, Pakistan.

He graduated in 1999 and received a degree of Bachelor of Arts from the University of the Punjab.

Political career
He was elected to the Provincial Assembly of the Punjab as a candidate of Pakistan Peoples Party (PPP) from Constituency PP-144 (Lahore-I) in 2002 Pakistani general election.

He was re-elected to the Provincial Assembly of the Punjab as a candidate of Pakistan Muslim League (N) from Constituency PP-144 (Lahore-I) in 2018 Pakistani general election.

References

Living people
Punjab MPAs 2002–2007
Punjab MPAs 2018–2023
Pakistan People's Party MPAs (Punjab)
Pakistan Muslim League (N) MPAs (Punjab)
Politicians from Lahore
1960 births